Camden-Frontier Schools is a public school district located in Camden, Michigan.

References

External links
District website

Education in Hillsdale County, Michigan
School districts in Michigan